CJCE-FM, branded as The Juice, was a low-power Canadian radio station broadcasting a Christian format airing at 93.7 FM, licensed to Godfrey, Ontario. The station was licensed by the Canadian Radio-television and Telecommunications Commission in 2002 to transmit at 106.3 MHz which later changed to its current frequency 93.7 MHz. The station is owned and operated by the Christian Youth Centre in Kingston, the owners of Camp IAWAH, a summer camp on Wolfe Lake, located west of Westport. The name "IAWAH" is an acronym for In All Ways Acknowledge Him, a line from Proverbs 3:6.

The station began broadcasting in 2003 from Camp IAWAH and broadcasts only during the summer months. At one watt, the station generally covers only Camp IAWAH and the surrounding area, the coverage area not reaching Westport or its city of license of Godfrey, located to the southwest.

On September 10, 2003, the CRTC approved the application by Christian Youth Centre (Kingston), doing business under the name and style of Camp IAWAH to increase the effective radiated power of CJCE-FM from 0.23 watts to 1.03 watts.

On October 6, 2008, the CRTC renewed CJCE-FM's license from 1 January 2009, to 31 August 2015.

In 2015, CJCE-FM's limited hours operation from Camp Iawah were discontinued.

References

External links
Camp IAWAH
 

Jce
Jce
Radio stations established in 2003
2003 establishments in Ontario
Jce

2015_disestablishments_in_Ontario 
Radio_stations_disestablished_in_2015
JCE-FM